The 20222023 mpox outbreak in France is part of the larger outbreak of human mpox caused by the West African clade of the monkeypox virus. France had its first case on 20 May 2022.

Background 

Detection in Europe

Transmission 

A large portion of those infected were believed to have not recently traveled to areas of Africa where mpox is normally found, such as Nigeria, the Democratic Republic of the Congo as well as central and western Africa. It is believed to be transmitted by close contact with sick people, with extra caution for those individuals with lesions on their skin or genitals, along with their bedding and clothing. The CDC has also stated that individuals should avoid contact and consumption of dead animals such as rats, squirrels, monkeys and apes along with wild game or lotions derived from animals in Africa.

Cases 
As of 2 August 2022, there were 2,171 confirmed cases of mpox reported in France, and as of 29 August 2022, there were 3,547 confirmed cases reported. As of 4 October 2022 there were 4,043 cases.

Ref: 
 FRA: June 7th, 9th, 14th, 16th, 21st,23rd, 28th July 5th, 7th, 12th, 19th, 21st, 26th, 28th,August 2nd, 4th, 9th, 11th, 16th, 18th, 23rd, 29th, Sept. 1st, 6th, 12th, 20th, 22nd,27th, Oct. 4th
 GER: 2022–2023 mpox outbreak in Germany#Cumulative number of cases, rev. 8 Oct. 2022
 U.S.: 2022–2023 mpox outbreak in the United States#Timeline, rev. 8 Oct. 2022

See also
 Non-replicating smallpox vaccine
 2022–2023 mpox outbreak
 2022–2023 mpox outbreak in Europe
 2022–2023 mpox outbreak in Germany
 2022–2023 mpox outbreak in Spain
 2022–2023 mpox outbreak in the United Kingdom

External links
 Our World in Data - Monkeypox (ourworldindata.org)
 Santé publique France: Les actualités (www.santepubliquefrance.fr)

Notes

References

France
Mpox
Mpox